Bujaki  is a village in the administrative district of Gmina Drohiczyn, within Siemiatycze County, Podlaskie Voivodeship, in north-eastern Poland.

The village has an approximate population of 200.

References

Bujaki